Marignane Gignac Côte Bleue Football Club, formerly known as Marignane Gignac Football Club is a French football club based in Marignane, Bouches-du-Rhône. It was founded in 1924 as Union Sportive Marignanaise. In 2016 US Marignanaise merged with AS Gignac to form the current club. On 1 July 2022, Marignane Gignac FC merged with FC Côte Bleue and became Marignane Gignac Côte Bleue FC (MGCB FC). The club currently plays in the Championnat National 2, the fourth tier of the French league system.

Current squad

External links

References 

 
Association football clubs established in 1924
1924 establishments in France
Sport in Bouches-du-Rhône
Football clubs in Provence-Alpes-Côte d'Azur